Roland Walter Lines FRIBA (14 March 1877 – 9 September 1916) was an English architect who became prolific after his emigration to Edmonton, Canada, in 1906. He served as a lieutenant with the Canadian Expeditionary Force in World War I. He died in active service in 1916, aged 39.

Early life and career 
Lines was born in Aldbury, Hertfordshire, on 14 March 1877, a son of John and Mary. 

He emigrated to Edmonton, Canada, in 1906. There, he designed several buildings, as well as a golf course.

In 1911, Donald Alexander Stewart emigrated to Edmonton from Perthshire, Scotland. He worked for Lines for a period after his arrival. Stewart returned to Scotland on war service in 1916.

Lines was elected a fellow of the Royal Institute of British Architects in 1914.

Selected notable works 
Below are some of Lines' works. He died while the construction of St. Joseph's Cathedral was in progress. It was completed in 1924.

 Strathcona High School, Edmonton 1908
 Edmonton City Power Station, 1910
 Hotel Cecil, Edmonton, 1910 (major addition)
 Canada Permanent Building, Edmonton, 1910
 North-West Mounted Police Station, Edmonton, 1910 (residence for the superintendent)
 Union Bank, Edmonton, 1910
 Victoria High School, Edmonton, 1911
 Northern Hotel, Edmonton, 1911
 Royal Alexandra Hospital, Edmonton, 1912 (additions)
 North-West Mounted Police headquarters, Edmonton 1913
 Edmonton Country Club clubhouse, 1913
 Bank of British North America Building, Edmonton, 1914
 St. Joseph's Cathedral, Edmonton, 1917 (began)

Death 
Lines died on 9 September 1916, aged 39, during service in World War I. A lieutenant, he is interred at the Albert Communal Cemetery Extension in the Somme, France.

References 

1877 births
1916 deaths
19th-century English architects
20th-century English architects
Architects from Hertfordshire
English emigrants to Canada
Canadian military personnel killed in World War I
Fellows of the Royal Institute of British Architects
Canadian Expeditionary Force officers
Royal Canadian Engineers officers